Freeze Die Come to Life (translit. Zamri, umri, voskresni!, also known as Don't Move, Die and Rise Again!) is a 1989 Soviet drama film directed by Vitali Kanevsky. It was screened in the Un Certain Regard section at the 1990 Cannes Film Festival, where it won the Caméra d'Or.

Cast
 Dinara Drukarova as Galia
 Pavel Nazarov as Valerka
 Yelena Popova as Valerka's mother
 Valeri Ivchenko
 Vyacheslav Bambushek as Vitka
 Vadim Yermolayev as School principal

References

External links

1989 films
1989 drama films
Soviet drama films
1980s Russian-language films
Soviet black-and-white films
Films directed by Vitali Kanevsky
Films set in Siberia
Lenfilm films
Caméra d'Or winners